Arnoldus Bernardus Jacobus Kuijlaars (born 1963) is a Dutch mathematician, specializing in approximation theory.

Kuijlaars completed his undergraduate studies at the Eindhoven University of Technology and received in 1991 his Ph.D. from Utrecht University with thesis Approximation of Metric Spaces with Applications in Potential Theory. Currently he is a professor at the Katholieke Universiteit Leuven.

In 1998 Kuijlaars won the triennially awarded Popov prize. In 2010 he was an invited speaker at the International Congress of Mathematicians at Hyderabad. In 2011 he was elected a corresponding member of the KNAW. In 2013 he was elected a fellow of the American Mathematical Society.

Selected publications

with E. B. Saff: 
with P. D. Dragner: 
with S. B. Damelin: 

with Maurice Duits and Man Yue Mo:

See also
Fekete problem
Riemann–Hilbert problem

References

External links
Arno Kuijlaars Publications with arxiv.org links

1963 births
Living people
20th-century Dutch mathematicians
Eindhoven University of Technology alumni
Utrecht University alumni
Academic staff of KU Leuven
Fellows of the American Mathematical Society
Members of the Royal Netherlands Academy of Arts and Sciences
Approximation theorists